Coastal Greenland Limited is a property developer in Mainland China. It is focused on the property development mainly in major cities of six major economic regions in China, namely Northeastern Region, Northern Region, Central Region, Eastern Region, Southern Region and Southwestern Region. It was established in 1990 and is headquartered in Hong Kong and was listed on the Hong Kong Stock Exchange in 1997.

References

External links
Coastal Greenland Limited 

Companies listed on the Hong Kong Stock Exchange
Real estate companies of Hong Kong
Real estate companies established in 1990
1990 establishments in Hong Kong